Abu Dawud al-Tayalisi (full name:) (750/751 – 819/820 CE) was a Muslim scholar and  (collector of hadiths) of the second century of Muslim calendar.

Biography
Al-Tayalisi was born in 133 according to the Muslim calendar (the year 750 or 751 of the Common Era) in the city of Basra, Iraq. He completed his initial studies in local town and then moved to Baghdad for higher education where he was taught by great scholars of that time such as Hammad ibn Salama, Abu Awana and Muhammad ibn Abd al-Rahman. Al-Tayalisi was considered a highly reliable hadith reporter by all scholars of hadith. He traveled widely across many countries to collect hadiths of Muhammad to complete his book. He died in 204 AH and was buried in Basra.

He is not to be confused with Abu Dawud al-Sijistani, who is the author of Sunan Abu Dawud, one of the six "canonical" hadith collections.

His works 

References 

10th-century Muslim scholars of Islam
Hadith compilers
People from Baghdad
Hadith scholars
Mujaddid
Taba‘ at-Tabi‘in hadith narrators
751 births
819 deaths